Anerio may refer to two notable brothers who were composers in Italy:

Felice Anerio ( 1560–1614)
Giovanni Francesco Anerio (1567–1630)